Bubaqra is a hamlet with its own administrative division in Żurrieq, Malta. It is a small rural village between Nigret and Ħal Far. It has a population of 2,000 people. At the centre of the zone is St Mary's Chapel.

Overview
The area was mentioned by Giovanni Francesco Abela in 1647 as Dejr el Bakar meaning house (territory) of the cows. Also known as Bvbakra, literally meaning 'father of the cows'. According to Godfrey Wittinger, Bakar may be a direct reference to a god that wakes the villagers, or a reference to a cowman who gives milk from his cows - which in the first case which originated from the Arab period, while the second case origins from the Siculo-Arabic influence or Italian from the word 'vaccaro'.

In 1579, the Bubaqra Tower was built on the outskirts of this hamlet. It was built as a country retreat by a member of the Order of St. John, and was used for defensive purposes at some points. The tower is currently privately owned, and it has been restored.

References

Populated places in Malta
Żurrieq